Spelaeodytes mirabilis is a species of beetle in the family Carabidae, the only species in the genus Spelaeodytes.

References

Scaritinae